Miguel de Cervantes or the Statue of Cervantes (Spanish: Estatua de Cervantes) is an instance of public art in Madrid, Spain. Erected in 1835, it is dedicated to Miguel de Cervantes Saavedra.

History and description 
By 1831 the Duke of San Fernando talked sculptor  about the prospect of creating a statue to pay homage to Cervantes. The Duke asked for permission to Ferdinand VII, yet the monarch seized the project for himself and charged  with the task of funding the monument instead.

The bronze statue by Solá was cast in Rome and arrived to Madrid in 1835. It features the standing figure of the writer with a slightly bent right leg, holding a roll of papers with his right hand and leaning the left one on the knob of his sword; he wears Spanish breeches, a buttoned-up jacket, ruff and a short cape.

Tentatively placed in the plaza del Duque de Nájera in the beginning, the monument was moved to the Plaza de las Cortes by July 1835.

The front and back sides of the pedestal feature two bronze plaques respectively reading the Latin language  and the Spanish translation .

The lateral sides of the main body of the pedestal (made of limestone and granite) feature two bronze reliefs by  related to Cervantes' magnum opus Don Quixote de la Mancha, depicting the adventure of the lions on the left-hand side and Don Quixote and Sancho Panza driven by the goddess of madness on the right-hand one. The circular basement on which the plinth emerges is made of granite.

From 1981 to 1986, during the mayoral mandate of Enrique Tierno Galván, four replicas of the bronze statue were gifted to New York, Moscow, Beijing and La Paz.

Its specific location in the Plaza de las Cortes was modified in 2009.

References 
Citations

Bibliography
 
 

Monuments and memorials in Madrid
Outdoor sculptures in Madrid
Sculptures of men in Spain
Cervantes
Bronze sculptures in Spain
Buildings and structures in Cortes neighborhood, Madrid
Statues of Miguel de Cervantes
1830s sculptures